Mario Ramberg Capecchi (born 6 October 1937) is an Italian-born molecular geneticist and a co-awardee of the 2007 Nobel Prize in Physiology or Medicine for discovering a method to create mice in which a specific gene is turned off, known as knockout mice. He shared the prize with Martin Evans and Oliver Smithies. He is currently  Distinguished Professor of Human Genetics and Biology at the University of Utah School of Medicine.

Life
Mario Capecchi was born in Verona, Italy, as the only child of Luciano Capecchi and Lucy Ramberg, an Italian-born daughter of American-born Impressionist painter Lucy Dodd Ramberg and German archaeologist Walter Ramberg. His parents weren't married, and due to the chaos in Europe caused by World War II, the story of his early life is remarkable, but the details are unclear. In 1941 he and his mother were living near Bolzano, about 160 miles north of his father in Reggio Emilia when his mother was arrested and deported for pamphleteering and belonging to an anti-Fascist group. Prior to her arrest she had made contingency plans by selling her belongings and giving the proceeds to a nearby peasant family to care for her child. However, it was not long before Mario ended up on the streets of Bolzano. In July 1942, a few months before his fifth birthday, Italian records suggest he was reunited with his father in Reggio Emilia, which Mario did confirm but stated that he stayed with his father for only for a few brief periods  and that he mostly lived on the streets until he was placed in an orphanage towards the end of the war.

Mario almost died of malnutrition. His mother survived the war in Germany (part of the reason the details of his early life are unclear is that she would never talk about her experiences), and when it ended she began a year-long search for him. She finally found him on his ninth birthday in a hospital bed in Reggio Emilia ill with a fever and subsisting on a daily bowl of chicory coffee and bread crust. She took him to Rome, where he had his first bath since he had left her care and where, with money sent by his uncle, Edward Ramberg, an American physicist at RCA, they made arrangements to depart to the United States. He and his mother moved to Pennsylvania to live at an "intentionally cooperative community" called Bryn Gweled, which had been co-founded by his uncle.  (Capecchi's other maternal uncle, Walter Ramberg, was also a prominent American physicist). He graduated from George School, a Quaker boarding school in Bucks County, Pennsylvania, in 1956.

Capecchi received his Bachelor of Science in chemistry and physics in 1961 from Antioch College in Ohio. Capecchi came to MIT as a graduate student intending to study physics and mathematics, but during the course of his studies, he became interested in molecular biology. His change of interest was driven by the preference of working with few scientists and conducting experiments that did not require the use of big machines. He subsequently transferred to Harvard to join the lab of James D. Watson, co-discoverer of the structure of DNA. Capecchi received his PhD in biophysics in 1967 from Harvard University, with his doctoral thesis completed under the tutelage of Watson.

Capecchi was a Junior Fellow of the Society of Fellows at Harvard University from 1967 to 1969. In 1969 he became an assistant professor in the Department of Biochemistry at Harvard Medical School. He was promoted to associate professor in 1971. In 1973 he joined the faculty at the University of Utah. Since 1988 Capecchi has also been an investigator of the Howard Hughes Medical Institute. He is a member of the National Academy of Sciences. He has given a talk for Duke University's Program in Genetics and Genomics as part of their Distinguished Lecturer Series. He was the speaker for the 2010 Racker Lectures in Biology & Medicine and Cornell Distinguished Lecture in Cell and Molecular Biology at Cornell University. He is a member of the Italy-USA Foundation.

After the Nobel committee publicly announced that Capecchi was awarded the Nobel prize, an Austrian woman named Marlene Bonelli claimed that Capecchi was her long-lost half-brother.
In May 2008, Capecchi met with Bonelli, 69, in northern Italy, and confirmed that she was his sister.

Knockout mice

Capecchi was awarded the Nobel prize for creating a knockout mouse. This is a mouse, created by genetic engineering and in vitro fertilization, in which a particular gene has been turned off. For this work, Capecchi was awarded the 2007 Nobel prize for medicine or physiology, along with Martin Evans and Oliver Smithies, who also contributed.

Capecchi has also pursued a systematic analysis of the mouse Hox gene family. This gene family plays a key role in the control of embryonic development in all multicellular animals.  They determine the placement of cellular development in the proper order along the axis of the body from head to toe.

Honours
1969 – Eli Lilly Award in Biological Chemistry
1992 – Bristol-Myers Squibb Award for Distinguished Achievement in Neuroscience Research
1993 – Gairdner Foundation International Award for Achievements in Medical Sciences
1993 – Gairdner Foundation International Award
1994 – General Motors Cancer Research Foundation Alfred P. Sloan Jr. Prize
1996 – Kyoto Prize in Basic Sciences
1996 – German Molecular Bioanalytics Prize
1997 – Franklin Medal for Advancing Our Knowledge of the Physical Sciences
1998 – Feodor Lynen Lectureship
1998 – Rosenblatt Prize for Excellence
1998 – Baxter Award for Distinguished Research in the Biomedical Sciences
1999 – Helen Lowe Bamberger Colby and John E. Bamberger Presidential Endowed Chair in the University of Utah Health Sciences Center
2000 – Lectureship in the Life Sciences for the Collège de France
2000 – Horace Mann Distinguished Alumni Award, Antioch College
2000 – Italian Premio Phoenix-Anni Verdi for Genetics Research Award
2001 – Albert Lasker Award for Basic Medical Research, co-winner with Martin Evans and Oliver Smithies
2001 – Spanish Jiménez-Diáz Prize
2001 – Pioneers of Progress Award
2001 – National Medal of Science
2002 – John Scott Medal Award
2002 – Massry Prize from the Keck School of Medicine, University of Southern California
2003 – Pezcoller Foundation-AACR International Award for Cancer Research
2002–2003 – Wolf Prize in Medicine
2005 – March of Dimes Prize in Developmental Biology
2007 – Jacob Heskel Gabbay Award for Biotechnology and Medicine
2007 – Nobel Prize in Physiology or Medicine, co-winner with Martin Evans and Oliver Smithies
2008 – American Heart Association Distinguished Scientist Award
2011 – Cátedra Santiago Grisolía Prize, Valencia Spain
2011 – Mike Hogg Award, The University of Texas MD Anderson Cancer Center
2012 – UCSF medal 
2012 – Honorary Doctorate Degree, University of Bologna Medical School, Italy
2013 – Honorary Doctorate Degree, Cardiff University, United Kingdom
2013 – Honorary Doctorate Degree, Ben-Gurion University, Israel
2013 – Trinity College Historical Society Gold Medal for Outstanding Contributions to Public Discourse, Dublin Ireland
2014 – Keynote Speaker at the Congress of Future Medical Leaders
2015 – American Association for Cancer Research Lifetime Achievement Award

References

External links
 Howard Hughes Medical Institute biography
Mario Capecchi's Short Talk: "The Birth of Gene Targeting"
  including the Nobel Lecture on 7 December 2007 Gene Targeting 1977 - Present
 Eccles Institute of Human Genetics biography
 University of Utah biography
 Interviews with Mario Capecchi from Dolan DNA Learning Center's DNA Interactive
 Capecchi animation from Dolan DNA Learning Center's DNA from the Beginning
 Interview with Dr Capecchi Futures in Biotech 63: How To Use A Mouse

1937 births
Members of the United States National Academy of Sciences
Living people
Scientists from Verona
American geneticists
American Nobel laureates
Antioch College alumni
Nobel laureates in Physiology or Medicine
Italian Nobel laureates
Harvard University alumni
University of Utah faculty
Kyoto laureates in Basic Sciences
Wolf Prize in Medicine laureates
Scientists from Salt Lake City
21st-century Italian inventors
National Medal of Science laureates
Howard Hughes Medical Investigators
Recipients of the Albert Lasker Award for Basic Medical Research
Italian emigrants to the United States
Homeless people
Street children
Massry Prize recipients
George School alumni
Members of the National Academy of Medicine